Iowa's 2nd congressional district is a congressional district in the U.S. state of Iowa that covers most of its northeastern part. It includes Cedar Rapids, Dubuque, Waterloo, and Grinnell.

The district is represented by Republican Ashley Hinson.

Statewide races since 2000
Election results from statewide races:

List of members representing the district

Recent election results

2002

2004

2006

2008

2010

2012

2014

2016

2018

2020

Rita Hart announced on March 31, 2021, that she was dropping her challenge before the House Administration Committee but maintained that her attempt to contest — which she lost by six votes —was valid.

Historical district boundaries

See also

Iowa's congressional districts
List of United States congressional districts

References

 Congressional Biographical Directory of the United States 1774–present

02